Webber Nunatak is a nunatak (495 m) standing 6 nautical miles (11 km) west of Mount Manthe in the Hudson Mountains. It was mapped using air photos taken by U.S. Navy Operation Highjump, which took place during 1946 and 1947, and named in 1967 by the Advisory Committee on Antarctic Names (US-ACAN) for George E. Webber, an electrical engineer at Byrd Station.

Webber Nunatak is one of several volcanic cones in the Hudson Mountains. Satellite imagery suggested an eruption at Webber Nunatak in 1985, although this remains unconfirmed.

References

Hudson Mountains
Nunataks of Ellsworth Land
Volcanoes of Ellsworth Land